Mysterion is a 1991 documentary film by Finnish directors Pirjo Honkasalo and Eira Mollberg about a convent of Russian Orthodox nuns who have dedicated their lives to serving God. It is the first part of Honkasalo's "Trilogy of the Sacred and the Satanic", followed by Tanjuska and the 7 Devils (1993) and Atman (1997). The film won the main prize at the Balticum Film & TV Festival in Denmark in 1992.

References

1991 films
1991 documentary films
Finnish documentary films
Films directed by Pirjo Honkasalo
Documentary films about Christianity
Documentary films about women and religion